Adam M. Brown (1826 – August 17, 1910) was a U.S. politician. He was Mayor of Pittsburgh in 1901.

Early life
Adam Mercer Brown was born in Butler County, Pennsylvania just north of Pittsburgh in 1826. He originally wanted to become a doctor but instead went west to find his fortune during the California Gold Rush, during his stay in the west he had a brief military career and earned the rank of Major. Upon his return to Pittsburgh he was chosen as the first president of the Allegheny County Bar Association. Adam Brown also became a common pleas judge and founded a bank.

Pittsburgh politics
Brown was appointed mayor in May 1901 and due to a commonwealth reorganization had his office retitled "recorder". He was only to spend six brief months running the city, and stripped of his duties in Nov 1901.

Death and interment
Brown died in Aug 1910, and was buried in the Allegheny Cemetery.

References

1826 births
1901 deaths
Mayors of Pittsburgh
Burials at Allegheny Cemetery
20th-century American politicians